Sanremo railway station is situated in the Italian city of Sanremo.

History
It was opened on 27 September 2001, with the opening of the new double-track line between Bordighera and Imperia, which is a deviation of the Genoa–Ventimiglia line, built mainly in tunnel.  The new station replaced an old picturesque station on a single track line that ran along the shore.

Overview

The Sanremo station building contains a ticket hall, waiting room, information office, kiosk, and bar. The entrance building is connected to the platforms built in a tunnel by a long corridor, equipped with a moving walkway. Travel time is approximately 10 minutes. The station has two platforms connected by an underpass.

As Sanremo is an important tourist destination and a significant source of commuter traffic, the station has substantial traffic. All trains stop at the station. Most trains are regional or express; some are Intercity trains. The most frequent destinations to the west are Ventimiglia and Nice, and to the east Imperia, Savona, Genoa. It is directly accessible from Milan (about 3½ h), Turin (about 4 h) and Rome (about 7½ h).

Old station
The old railway station of Sanremo was located in the middle of the town at Piazza Cesare Battisti, close to the coast.

Train services
The station is served by the following services:

Eurocity services (Thello) Marseille - Cannes - Nice - Monaco - Ventimiglia - Genoa - Milan

Notes

Railway stations in Liguria
Railway station
Railway stations opened in 1871
Railway stations opened in 2001